Ekaterina Bushueva (December 8, 1962 in Moscow, USSR – December 17, 2011 in Moscow, Russia) was a Russian draughts player. She has won the Women's World Draughts-64 Championship two times, won Women's Draughts-64 European Championship. Many times champion of Russia, International grandmaster in Russian draughts (since 1994).

From 1984 to 1991 she has six medals Draughts Championship of the USSR. Her every competitions in World and European Championship was with medal. Ekaterina Bushueva died at 49 years old after serious disease.

References

External links 
List of Women's Draughts-64 World Championship winners
Results
Women's Draughts-64 European Championship winners
WMSG Russian Draughts 8x8 women 2008. Swiss sistem
WMSG Russian Draughts 8x8 women Play Offs 2008

1962 births
Russian draughts players
Soviet draughts players
Players of Russian draughts
2011 deaths